Des Kennedy (born 1 September 1950) is a former Australian rules footballer who played with Hawthorn in the Victorian Football League (VFL).

Notes

External links 

Living people
1950 births
Australian rules footballers from Victoria (Australia)
Hawthorn Football Club players